Red Bull Arena (formerly Zentralstadion ), is a football facility located in Leipzig, Saxony, Germany. It is the largest football stadium in eastern Germany, and has also hosted music concerts as well as football.

Opened in 2004, it is currently the home stadium for Bundesliga club RB Leipzig, with FC Sachsen Leipzig having previously used the stadium from its opening until 2009. Due to UEFA sponsorship regulations, the stadium is known as the RB Arena for European matches.

Background

In 1956, the first Zentralstadion opened, at the time it was one of the biggest stadiums in Europe being able to hold 100,000 spectators. Various Leipzig football teams used the venue as a home stadium, including VfB Leipzig (precursor to 1. FC Lokomotive Leipzig) at various points in the 20th century (including large-scale European matches in the 1970s and domestic football in the 1990s). However, over the years it fell into disuse and was costing the city too much to maintain. In 1997, the city of Leipzig decided to build a new stadium within the old stadium, a modern state of the art stadium only for football. Construction of the new stadium took place from December 2000 to March 2004. A similar endeavor of constructing a new stadium within the confines of an historic stadium's exterior was completed in Chicago's Soldier Field, which similarly built a modern stadium while preserving the exterior of the original structure.

History
The Zentralstadion was the only stadium in eastern Germany to host games in the 2006 FIFA World Cup. It hosted four group matches and a round of 16 game in the tournament. A year earlier, it was also one of the venues for the 2005 FIFA Confederations Cup and hosted three matches of the tournament, including the third-place match. From 2005 to 2007, the Zentralstadion was host of the German League Cup final.

FC Sachsen Leipzig used the stadium as a home ground from time to time between 2004 and 2007, however they moved back to their traditional home, the Alfred-Kunze-Sportpark at the start of the 2008–09 season.

In July 2009, energy drink manufacturer Red Bull took over the license of SSV Markranstädt and renamed the team RasenBallsport Leipzig, in short RB Leipzig. From the outset, the new team outlined their wish to move into the tenant-less Zentralstadion and rename it the "Red Bull Arena". The naming rights were granted on 25 March 2010 and the stadium will be named so for a minimum period of 10 years as of 1 July 2010. The cost for renting the stadium will rise in accordance with the level of football RasenBallsport Leipzig are at. The team has pledged to upgrade the seating, install video advertising boards and make changes to the boxes and the VIP area.

In the 2010–11 season, Hallescher FC played between three and five games at the Zentralstadion due to their own Kurt-Wabbel Stadion being renovated.

In 2014, the stadium was ranked 17th in the country based on attendance, safety, and number of events.

Future expansion

In October 2015, expansion of the Red Bull Arena was back on the agenda. New plans were made to expand the stadium to 57,000 seats, involving Viennese architect Albert Wimmer. Reconstruction could start in the summer break of 2016. In January 2016, the club decided to put the plans on hold, at least until 2017.

In December 2016 RB Leipzig proposed that the stadium would be sold from former owner Michael Kölmel to the club to continue the plans from the 2015 agenda. Due to the move of the arena into ownership of Red Bull, a new stadium was out of possibility. The Stadium will expand to a total of 53,840 Seats as of Summer 2021, beginning from November 2018, when construction works will start.

Facilities

There are bridges built over the old stadium to connect with the new stadium. The roof has an integrated floodlight design and is designed to provide superior acoustics. The grass area is 120 x 80 m, the actual playing field is 105 x 68 m. It has been integrated into the area surrounding the stadium by large numbers of trees and other greenery.

External dimensions
 North to South: 230 m
 East to West: 210 m
 Height to Roof: 46.5 m
 Roof Area: 28,100 m²
 Map Coordinates: 51° 20' 44" N; 12° 20' 54" E

2006 FIFA World Cup
The stadium was one of the venues for the 2006 FIFA World Cup, the only one located in eastern Germany.

The following games were played at the stadium during the 2006 World Cup:

Other uses
The arena is frequently used as a concert venue. Tina Turner (2000), Paul McCartney (2004), Herbert Grönemeyer (2007, 2011), Genesis (2007), Bon Jovi (2008), Depeche Mode (2009, 2013), AC/DC (2009, 2016), Mario Barth (2011),  Coldplay (2012, 2017), Bruce Springsteen & The E Street Band (2013), and Helene Fischer (2015, 2018) have all played at this venue.

References

External links

 Facts and photos about the old and new Zentralstadion at Erlebnis-stadion.de
 Homepage Zentralstadion

2006 FIFA World Cup stadiums
Buildings and structures in Leipzig
FC Sachsen Leipzig
2005 FIFA Confederations Cup stadiums
UEFA Euro 2024 stadiums
Football venues in Germany
RB Leipzig
Red Bull
Sport in Leipzig
Sports venues completed in 2004
Sports venues in Saxony